States' rights in the United States of America are political powers reserved for the U.S. state governments rather than the federal government.

States' Rights, States Rights, or state rights may also refer to:

 States' Rights Party (disambiguation), various U.S. political parties, typically opposed to federal civil rights programs
 States' rights speech, given by Ronald Reagan during his 1980 election campaign
 States Rights Records, Oregon independent record label
 States Rights Gist (1831–64) South Carolina Confederate Army officer
 Slavery and States' Rights, speech by Joseph Wheeler on July 31, 1894

See also 
 Balance of power (federalism), the same idea for other federal countries

 Public international law, discusses rights of independent states, including
 Right to exist
 Self-determination
 Sovereignty 

 Subsidiarity (European Union), a similar principle in the European Union